

Y - Australia 

The prefix Y is reserved for Australia. For many (but not all) Australian ICAO codes, the second letter indicates which flight information region (FIR) the airport belongs to – B Brisbane, S Sydney, M Melbourne and P Perth. However, the Sydney and Perth FIRs no longer exist and have been merged into the Brisbane and Melbourne FIRs, although the airport codes remain unchanged (e.g. Sydney YSSY, Darwin YPDN).

Airport codes with the second letter X are reserved for heliports and are often associated with hospitals (e.g. Canberra Hospital, YXCB)

Format of entries is:
 ICAO (IATA) – airport name – airport location

YA 
 YABA (ALH) – Albany Airport – Albany, Western Australia
 YABI (ABG) – Abingdon Downs Airport – Abingdon Downs, Queensland
 YADG – Aldinga Airfield – Aldinga, South Australia
 YADS (AWN) – Alton Downs Airport – Alton Downs, South Australia
YAFD – The Alfred Hospital – Melbourne, Victoria
 YAGD (AUD) – Augustus Downs Airport – Stokes
 YALA (MRP) – Marla Airport – Welbourn Hill
 YALX (AXL) – Alexandria Station Airport – Alexandria Station, Northern Territory
 YAMB – RAAF Amberley – Ipswich, Queensland
 YAMC (AXC) – Aramac Airport – Aramac, Queensland
 YAMK (ADO) – Andamooka Airport – Andamooka, South Australia
 YAMM (AMX) – Ammaroo Airport
 YAMT (AMT) – Amata Airport – Amata, South Australia
 YANG (WLP) – West Angelas Airport
 YANL (AYL) – Anthony Lagoon Airport – Anthony Lagoon
 YAPH (ABH) – Alpha Airport – Alpha, Queensland
 YAPO – Apollo Bay Airport – Apollo Bay, Victoria
 YARA (ARY) – Ararat Airport – Ararat, Victoria
 YARG (GYL) – Argyle Airport – Lake Argyle, Western Australia
 YARM (ARM) – Armidale Airport – Armidale, New South Wales
 YARY (AAB) – Arrabury Airport – Arrabury, Queensland
 YAUR (AUU) – Aurukun Airport – Aurukun, Queensland
 YAUS (AWP) – Austral Downs Station Airport – Austral Downs Station, Northern Territory
 YAUV (AVG) – Auvergne Airport (Australia) – Auvergne Station
 YAYE (AYQ) – Ayers Rock Airport – Yulara, Northern Territory
 YAYR (AYR) – Ayr Airport – Ayr, Queensland

YB 
 YBAF – Archerfield Airport – Archerfield, Queensland
 YBAR (BCI) – Barcaldine Airport – Barcaldine, Queensland
 YBAS (ASP) – Alice Springs Airport – Alice Springs, Northern Territory
 YBAU (BDD) – Badu Island Airport – Badu Island, Queensland
 YBAW (BKP) – Barkly Downs Airport – Barkly Downs
 YBBN (BNE) – Brisbane Airport – Brisbane, Queensland
 YBCG (OOL) – Gold Coast Airport – Coolangatta, Queensland
 YBCK (BKQ) – Blackall Airport – Blackall, Queensland
 YBCS (CNS) – Cairns International Airport – Cairns, Queensland
 YBCV (CTL) – Charleville Airport – Charleville, Queensland
 YBDF (BDW) – Bedford Downs Airport – Bedford Downs Station, Western Australia
 YBDG (BXG) – Bendigo Airport – Bendigo, Victoria
 YBDV (BVI) – Birdsville Airport – Birdsville, Queensland
 YBEB (BXF) – Bellburn Airport
 YBEO (BTX) – Betoota Airport – Betoota
 YBGD (OCM) – Boolgeeda Airport – Boolgeeda, Western Australia
 YBGO (BQW) – Balgo Hill Airport – Balgo, Western Australia
 YBHI (BHQ) – Broken Hill Airport – Broken Hill, New South Wales
 YBHM (HTI) – Great Barrier Reef Airport – Hamilton Island, Queensland
 YBIE (BEU) – Bedourie Airport – Bedourie, Queensland
 YBIL (BIW) – Billiluna Airport – Billiluna, Western Australia
 YBKE (BRK) – Bourke Airport – Bourke, New South Wales
 YBKT (BUC) – Burketown Airport – Burketown, Queensland
 YBLA (BLN) – Benalla Airport – Benalla, Victoria
 YBLC (LCN) – Balcanoona Airport – Balcanoona
 YBLL (BLS) – Bollon Airport – Bollon
 YBLN (BQB) – Busselton Margaret River Airport – Busselton, Western Australia
 YBLT – Ballarat Airport – Ballarat, Victoria
 YBMA (ISA) – Mount Isa Airport – Mount Isa, Queensland
 YBMK (MKY) – Mackay Airport – Mackay, Queensland
 YBNA (BNK) – Ballina Byron Gateway Airport – Ballina, New South Wales
 YBNS (BSJ) – Bairnsdale Airport – Bairnsdale, Victoria
 YBOI (GIC) – Boigu Island Airport – Boigu Island, Queensland
 YBOK (OKY) – Oakey Army Aviation Centre – Oakey, Queensland
 YBOU (BQL) – Boulia Airport – Boulia, Queensland
 YBPI (BMP) – Brampton Island Airport – Brampton Island
 YBPN (PPP) – Whitsunday Coast Airport – Proserpine, Queensland
 YBRK (ROK) – Rockhampton Airport – Rockhampton, Queensland
 YBRL (BOX) – Borroloola Airport – Borroloola, Northern Territory
 YBRM (BME) – Broome International Airport – Broome, Western Australia
 YBRN (BZD) – Balranald Airport – Balranald, New South Wales
 YBRS – Barwon Heads Airport – Barwon Heads, Victoria
 YBRW (BWQ) – Brewarrina Airport – Brewarrina, New South Wales
 YBRY (BYP) – Barimunya Airport – Barimunya, Western Australia
 YBSG – RAAF Scherger – Weipa, Queensland
 YBSS – Bacchus Marsh Airport – Bacchus Marsh, Victoria
 YBSU (MCY) – Sunshine Coast Airport – Marcoola, Sunshine Coast, Queensland
 YBTH (BHS) – Bathurst Airport – Bathurst, New South Wales
 YBTI (BRT) – Bathurst Island Airport – Bathurst Island, Northern Territory
 YBTL (TSV) – Townsville International Airport / RAAF Townsville (joint use) – Townsville, Queensland
 YBTR (BLT) – Blackwater Airport – Blackwater, Queensland
 YBUD (BDB) – Bundaberg Airport – Bundaberg, Queensland
 YBUN (BUY) – Bunbury Airport – Bunbury, Western Australia
 YBWM (BIP) – Bulimba Airport – Bulimba, Queensland
 YBWN (ZBO) – Bowen Airport – Bowen, Queensland
 YBWP (WEI) – Weipa Airport – Weipa, Queensland
 YBWR (BCK) – Bolwarra Airport – Bolwarra, Queensland
 YBWW (WTB) – Toowoomba Wellcamp Airport – Wellcamp, Queensland
 YBWX (BWB) – Barrow Island Airport – Barrow Island, Western Australia
 YBYS (BVZ) – Beverley Springs Airport – Beverley Springs

YC 
 YCAB (CA3) – Caboolture Airfield – Caboolture, Queensland
 YCAG (CGV) – Caiguna Airport – Caiguna, Western Australia
 YCAH (CLH) – Coolah Airport – Coolah, New South Wales
 YCAR (CVQ) – Carnarvon Airport – Carnarvon, Western Australia
 YCAS (CSI) – Casino Airport
 YCBA (CAZ) – Cobar Airport – Cobar, New South Wales
 YCBB (COJ) – Coonabarabran Airport – Coonabarabran, New South Wales
 YCBE (CBY) – Canobie Airport
 YCBG – Cambridge Aerodrome – Cambridge, Tasmania
 YCBN (CBI) – Cape Barren Island Airport – Cape Barren Island
 YCBP (CPD) – Coober Pedy Airport – Coober Pedy, South Australia
 YCBR (CRB) – Collarenebri Airport – Collarenebri, New South Wales
 YCCA (CCL) – Chinchilla Airport – Chinchilla, Queensland
 YCCT (CNC) – Coconut Island Airport – Coconut Island, Queensland
 YCCY (CNJ) – Cloncurry Airport – Cloncurry, Queensland
 YCDE – Cobden Airport – Cobden, Victoria
 YCDO (CBX) – Condobolin Airport – Condobolin, New South Wales
 YCDR (CUD) – Caloundra Airport – Caloundra West, Queensland
 YCDU (CED) – Ceduna Airport – Ceduna, South Australia
 YCEE (CVC) – Cleve Airport – Cleve, South Australia
 YCEM – Coldstream Airport – Coldstream, Victoria
 YCFD (CFI) – Camfield Airport
 YCFH (CFH) – Clifton Hills Landing Strip – Clifton Hills
 YCFS (CFS) – Coffs Harbour Airport – Coffs Harbour, New South Wales
 YCGO (LLG) – Chillagoe Airport – Chillagoe, Queensland
 YCHT (CXT) – Charters Towers Airport – Charters Towers, Queensland
 YCIN (DCN) – RAAF Curtin – Derby, Western Australia
 YCKI (CKI) – Croker Island Airport – Croker Island, Northern Territory
 YCKN (CTN) – Cooktown Airport – Cooktown, Queensland
 YCLB – Claremont Airbase – Brukunga, South Australia
 YCMT (CMQ) – Clermont Airport – Clermont, Queensland
 YCMU (CMA) – Cunnamulla Airport – Cunnamulla, Queensland
 YCMW (CML) – Camooweal Airport – Camooweal, Queensland
 YCNF (NIF) – Nifty Airport – Nifty Copper Mine, Western Australia
 YCNK (CES) – Cessnock Airport – Cessnock, New South Wales
 YCNM (CNB) – Coonamble Airport – Coonamble, New South Wales
 YCOD (ODL) – Cordillo Downs Airport – Cordillo Downs
 YCOE (CUQ) – Coen Airport – Coen, Queensland
 YCOM (OOM) – Cooma - Snowy Mountains Airport – Cooma, New South Wales
 YCOO (CDA) – Cooinda Airport – Cooinda, Queensland
 YCPT – Carrapateena Airport
 YCOR (CWW) – Corowa Airport – Corowa, New South Wales
 YCRG (CYG) – Corryong Airport – Corryong, Victoria
 YCRK (CXQ) – Christmas Creek Airport – Christmas Creek Station, Western Australia
 YCRY (CDQ) – Croydon Airport (Victoria)
 YCSV (KCE) – Collinsville Airport
 YCTM (CMD) – Cootamundra Airport – Cootamundra, New South Wales
 YCUA (CUG) – Cudal Airport
 YCUE (CUY) – Cue Airport – Cue, Western Australia
 YCWA (CJF) – Coondewanna Airport – Coondewanna, Western Australia
 YCWI (CWR) – Cowarie Airport – Cowarie Station, South Australia
 YCWL (CCW) – Cowell Airport – Cowell, South Australia
 YCWR (CWT) – Cowra Airport – Cowra, New South Wales
 YCWY (COY) – Coolawanyah Station Airport – Coolawanyah Station, Western Australia

YD 
 YDAJ – Dajarra Airport
 YDAY (DBY) – Dalby Airport
 YDBI (DRN) – Dirranbandi Airport – Dirranbandi, Queensland
 YDBR (DNB) – Dunbar Airport
 YDBY (DRB) – Derby Airport – Derby, Western Australia
 YDDF (DFP) – Drumduff Airport – Drumduff, Queensland
 YDGA (DGD) – Dalgaranga Gold Mine Airport
 YDIX (DXD) – Dixie Airport
 YDKI (DKI) – Dunk Island Airport – Dunk Island, Australia
 YDLK (DLK) – Dulkaninna Airport – Dulkaninna
 YDLO – Darlot Airport – Darlot-Centenary Gold Mine, Western Australia
 YDLQ (DNQ) – Deniliquin Airport – Deniliquin, New South Wales
 YDLT (DDN) – Delta Downs Airport – Delta Downs Station
 YDLV (DLV) – Delissaville Airport
 YDLW (DYW) – Daly Waters Airport – Daly Waters, Northern Territory
 YDMG (DMD) – Doomadgee Airport – Doomadgee, Queensland
 YDMN (DVR) – Daly River Mission Airport – Daly River Mission, Northern Territory
 YDNI (NLF) – Darnley Island Airport – Darnley Island
 YDOC – Dochra Airfield – Singleton, New South Wales
 YDOD – Donald Airport – Donald, Victoria
 YDOP – Donnington Airpark – Woodstock, Queensland
 YDOR (DRD) – Dorunda Airport
 YDPD (DVP) – Davenport Downs Airport
 YDPO (DPO) – Devonport Airport – Devonport, Tasmania
 YDRA (DOX) – Dongara Airport
 YDRD (DRY) – Drysdale River Airport – Drysdale River Station, Western Australia
 YDRH (DHD) – Durham Downs Airport
 YDRI (DRR) – Durrie Airport
 YDVR (DKV) – Docker River Airport
 YDYS (DYA) – Dysart Airport – Dysart, Queensland

YE 
 YECH (ECH) – Echuca Airport – Echuca, Victoria
 YECL (EUC) – Eucla Airport
 YEDA (ETD) – Etadunna Airstrip – Etadunna, South Australia
 YEEB (ENB) – Eneabba Airport
 YEIN (EIH) – Einasleigh Airport – Einasleigh, Queensland
 YELD (ELC) – Elcho Island Airport – Elcho Island, Northern Territory
 YEMG – Eromanga Airport
 YEML (EMD) – Emerald Airport – Emerald, Queensland
 YENO – Enoggera HLS – Enoggera, Queensland
 YESE (ERQ) – Elrose Airport – Eloise Copper Mine, Queensland
 YESP (EPR) – Esperance Airport – Esperance, Western Australia
 YEVD (EVH) – Evans Head Memorial Aerodrome – Evans Head, New South Wales
 YEXM (EXM) – Exmouth Airport

YF 
 YFBS (FRB) – Forbes Airport – Forbes, New South Wales
 YFDF (KFE) – Fortescue Dave Forrest Airport
 YFIL (FLY) – Finley Airport
 YFLI (FLS) – Flinders Island Airport – Flinders Island (Whitemark), Tasmania
 YFLO (FVL) – Flora Valley Airport
 YFNE (FIK) – Finke Airport
 YFRT (FOS) – Forrest Airport – Forrest, Western Australia
 YFSK – Fiskville CFA Training Ground Airstrip – Fiskville, Victoria near Ballan
 YFST (FOT) – Forster (Wallis Island) Airport – Forster, New South Wales
 YFTA – Forrestania Airport – Forrestania, Western Australia
 YFTZ (FIZ) – Fitzroy Crossing Airport – Fitzroy Crossing, Western Australia

YG 
 YGAD – HMAS Stirling – Garden Island, Western Australia
 YGAM (GBP) – Gamboola Airport
 YGAW – Gawler Airfield – South Australia 
 YGAY (GAH) – Gayndah Airport – Gayndah, Queensland
 YGBI (GBL) – Goulburn Island Airport
 YGDA – Goodooga Airport – Goodooga
 YGDH (GUH) – Gunnedah Airport – Gunnedah, New South Wales
 YGDI (GOO) – Goondiwindi Airport – Goondiwindi, Queensland
 YGDN (GDD) – Gordon Downs Airport
 YGDS (GGD) – Gregory Downs Airport
 YGDW (GTS) – Granite Downs Airport
 YGEL (GET) – Geraldton Airport – Geraldton, Western Australia
 YGFN (GFN) – Clarence Valley Regional Airport – Grafton, New South Wales
 YGIA (GBW) – Ginbata Airport – Ginbata
 YGIB (GBV) – Gibb River Airport
 YGIG – RAAF Base Gingin – Gingin, Western Australia
 YGKL (GKL) – Great Keppel Island Airport
 YGLA (GLT) – Gladstone Airport – Gladstone, Queensland
 YGLB (GUL) – Goulburn Airport – Goulburn, New South Wales
 YGLE (GLG) – Glengyle Airport
 YGLG (GEX) – Geelong Airport – Grovedale, Victoria
 YGLI (GLI) – Glen Innes Airport – Glen Innes, New South Wales
 YGLO (GLM) – Glenormiston Airport
 YGNB – RAAF Base Glenbrook (helipads only) – Glenbrook, New South Wales
 YGNV (GVP) – Greenvale Airport
 YGON (GPD) – Mount Gordon Airport
 YGPT (GPN) – Garden Point Airport – Melville Island, Northern Territory
 YGRS – Granny Smith Airport – Granny Smith Gold Mine, Western Australia
 YGSC (GSC) – Gascoyne Junction Airport – Gascoyne Junction
 YGTE (GTE) – Groote Eylandt Airport – Groote Eylandt (Alyangula), Northern Territory
 YGTH (GFF) – Griffith Airport – Griffith, New South Wales
 YGTN (GTT) – Georgetown Airport (Australia)
 YGTO (GEE) – George Town Airport – George Town, Tasmania
 YGWA – Goolwa Airport – Goolwa, South Australia
 YGYM (GYP) – Gympie Airport – Gympie, Queensland

YH 
 YHAW (HWK) – Hawker Airport – Hawker, South Australia
 YHAY (HXX) – Hay Airport – Hay, New South Wales
 YHBA (HVB) – Hervey Bay Airport – Hervey Bay, Queensland
 YHBR (HUB) – Humbert River Airport
 YHBY (HRY) – Henbury Airport – Henbury Station, Northern Territory
 YHDY (HIP) – Headingly Airport – Headingly Station, Queensland
 YHHY (HIG) – Highbury Airport
 YHID (HID) – Horn Island Airport – Horn Island, Queensland
 YHIL (HLL) – Hillside Airport (Australia)
 YHLC (HCQ) – Halls Creek Airport – Halls Creek, Western Australia
 YHMB (HMG) – Hermannsburg Airport – Hermannsburg, Northern Territory
 YHML (HLT) – Hamilton Airport – Hamilton, Victoria
 YHOO (HOK) – Hooker Creek Airport – Lajamanu, Northern Territory
 YHOT (MHU) – Mount Hotham Airport – Bright, Victoria
 YHOX – Hoxton Park Airport – Hoxton Park, New South Wales
 YHPN (HTU) – Hopetoun Airport – Hopetoun, Victoria
 YHSM (HSM) – Horsham Airport – Horsham, Victoria
 YHTL (HAT) – Heathlands Airport
 YHUG (HGD) – Hughenden Airport – Hughenden, Queensland
 YHYL – Hoyleton Airbase – Hoyleton, South Australia

YI 
 YIDK (IDK) – Indulkana Airport
 YIFL (IFL) – Innisfail Airport (Queensland)
 YIFY (IFF) – Iffley Airport
 YIGM (IGH) – Ingham Airport
 YIKM (IKP) – Inkerman Airport
 YIMB – Kimba Airport – Kimba, South Australia
 YINJ (INJ) – Injune Airport
 YINN (INM) – Innamincka Airport
 YINW (IVW) – Inverway Airport – Inverway Station, Northern Territory
 YISF (ISI) – Isisford Airport
 YITT – Mitta Mitta Airport – Mitta Mitta, Victoria
 YIVL (IVR) – Inverell Airport – Inverell, New South Wales

YJ 
 YJAB (JAB) – Jabiru Airport – Jabiru, Northern Territory
 YJAC – Jacinth Ambrosia Airport – Jacinth Ambrosia, Ceduna, South Australia
 YJBY – Jervis Bay Airfield – Jervis Bay, New South Wales / Jervis Bay Territory
 YJDA (JUN) – Jundah Airport – Jundah, Queensland
 YJLC (JCK) – Julia Creek Airport – Julia Creek, Queensland
 YJNB (JUR) – Jurien Bay Airport – Jurien Bay, Western Australia
 YJUN – Jundee Airport – Jundee Gold Mine, Western Australia
 YJIN – Jindaybyne Airfield – Jindabyne, New South Wales

YK 
 YKAL (UBU) – Kalumburu Airport – Kalumburu, Western Australia
 YKAR (KQR) – Karara Airport – Karara, Western Australia
 YKAT – Katoomba Airport – Katoomba, New South Wales
 YKBL (KDB) – Kambalda Airport – Kambalda, Western Australia
 YKBR (KAX) – Kalbarri Airport – Kalbarri, Western Australia
 YKBY – Streaky Bay Airport – Streaky Bay, South Australia
 YKCA (KBJ) – Kings Canyon Airport
 YKCS (KCS) – Kings Creek Station Airport
 YKER (KRA) – Kerang Airport – Kerang, Victoria
 YKII (KNS) – King Island Airport – King Island, Tasmania
 YKKG (KFG)– Kalkgurung Airport – Kalkarindji, Northern Territory
 YKLA (KOH) – Koolatah Airport
 YKLB (KKP) – Koolburra Airport
 YKMB (KRB) – Karumba Airport – Karumba, Queensland
 YKML (KML) – Kamileroi Airport
 YKMP (KPS) – Kempsey Airport – Kempsey, New South Wales
 YKNG (KNI) – Katanning Airport – Katanning, Western Australia
 YKOW (KWM) – Kowanyama Airport – Kowanyama, Queensland
 YKPR (KPP) – Kalpowar Airport
 YKRY (KGY) – Kingaroy Airport – Kingaroy, Queensland
 YKSC (KGC) – Kingscote Airport – Kingscote, Kangaroo Island, South Australia
 YKTN – Kyneton Airport – Kyneton, Victoria
 YKUB (KUG) – Kubin Airport – Kubin, Queensland

YL 
 YLAH (LWH) – Lawn Hill Airport
 YLEC (LGH) – Leigh Creek Airport – Leigh Creek, South Australia
 YLED – Lethbridge Airpark – Lethbridge, Victoria
 YLEG – Leongatha Airport – Leongatha, Victoria
 YLEO (LNO) – Leonora Airport – Leonora, Western Australia
 YLEV (LEL) – Lake Evella Airport – Gapuwiyak, Northern Territory
 YLFD (LFP) – Lakefield Airport
 YLHI (LDH) – Lord Howe Island Airport – Lord Howe Island, New South Wales
 YLHR (IRG) – Lockhart River Airport – Lockhart River, Queensland
 YLHS (LTP) – Lyndhurst Airport
 YLIL – Lilydale Airport – Lilydale, Victoria
 YLIN (LDC) – Lindeman Island Airport
 YLIS (LSY) – Lismore Airport – Lismore, New South Wales
 YLKN (LNH) – Lake Nash Airport
 YLLE (BBL) – Ballera Airport
 YLMQ (BEO) – Belmont Airport – Pelican, New South Wales
 YLND (LKD) – Lakeland Downs Airport
 YLOK (LOC) – Lock Airport
 YLOR (LOA) – Lorraine Airport (Australia)
 YLOV (LTV) – Lotus Vale Station Airport
 YLOX – Loxton Airport – Loxton, South Australia
 YLRA (LUU) – Laura Airport – Laura, Queensland
 YLRD (LHG) – Lightning Ridge Airport – Lightning Ridge, New South Wales
 YLRE (LRE) – Longreach Airport – Longreach, Queensland
 YLRS (LUT) – New Laura Airport
 YLST (LER) – Leinster Airport – Leinster, Western Australia
 YLTN (LVO) – Laverton Airport – Laverton, Western Australia
 YLTV (LTB) – Latrobe Valley Airport – Morwell, Victoria
 YLVK – Lavarack Barracks – Townsville, Queensland
 YLZI (LZR) – Lizard Island Airport – Lizard Island, Queensland

YM 
 YMAA (UBB) – Mabuiag Island Airport – Mabuiag Island
 YMAV (AVV) – Avalon Airport – Avalon, Victoria
 YMAY (ABX) – Albury Airport – Albury, New South Wales
 YMBA (MRG) – Mareeba Airport – Mareeba, Queensland
 YMBD – Murray Bridge Airport – Murray Bridge, South Australia
 YMBL (MBB) – Marble Bar Airport
 YMBU – Maryborough Airport – Maryborough, Victoria
 YMCO (XMC) – Mallacoota Airport – Mallacoota, Victoria
 YMCR (MFP) – Manners Creek Station Airport
 YMCT (MLR) – Millicent Airport
 YMDG (DGE) – Mudgee Airport – Mudgee, New South Wales
 YMDI (MQA) – Mandora Station Airport
 YMDN – Merredin Airport – Merredin
 YMDS (MNW) – MacDonald Downs Airport
 YMEK (MKR) – Meekatharra Airport – Meekatharra, Western Australia
 YMEN (MEB) – Essendon Airport – Essendon North, Victoria
 YMER (MIM) – Merimbula Airport – Merimbula, New South Wales
 YMES (SXE) – RAAF East Sale – Sale, Victoria
 YMEU (MLV) – Merluna Airport
 YMGB (MGT) – Milingimbi Airport – Milingimbi Island, Northern Territory
 YMGD (MNG) – Maningrida Airport – Maningrida, Northern Territory
 YMGN (GSN) – Mount Gunson Airport
 YMGR (MGV) – Margaret River Station Airport – Margaret River Station, Western Australia
 YMGT (MQZ) – Margaret River Airport – Margaret River, Western Australia
 YMGV (MVU) – Musgrave Airport
 YMHB (HBA) – Hobart International Airport – Cambridge, Tasmania
 YMHO (MHO) – Mount House Airport
 YMIA (MQL) – Mildura Airport – Mildura, Victoria
 YMIG – Mittagong Airport
 YMIN (XML) – Minlaton Airport
 YMIP (MIH) – Mitchell Plateau Airport
 YMIR (MWY) – Miranda Downs Airport
 YMIT (MTQ) – Mitchell Airport, Queensland
 YMJM (MJP) – Manjimup Airport – Manjimup, Western Australia
 YMLS (WLE) – Miles Airport – Miles, Queensland
 YMLT (LST) – Launceston Airport – Launceston, Tasmania
 YMMB (MBW) – Moorabbin Airport – Moorabbin, Victoria
 YMMI (WUI) – Murrin Murrin Airport – Murrin Murrin
 YMML (MEL) – Melbourne Airport – Melbourne, Victoria
 YMMU (MMM) – Middlemount Airport – Middlemount, Queensland
 YMND (MTL) – Maitland Airport – Rutherford, New South Wales
 YMNE (WME) – Mount Keith Airport – Mount Keith, Western Australia
 YMNG – Mangalore Airport – Mangalore, Victoria
 YMNK (ONR) – Monkira Airport
 YMNS (MSF) – Mount Swan Airport
 YMNY (OXY) – Morney Airport
 YMOG (MMG) – Mount Magnet Airport – Mount Magnet, Western Australia
 YMOO (OOR) – Mooraberree Airport
 YMOR (MRZ) – Moree Airport – Moree, New South Wales
 YMOT (MET) – Moreton Airport
 YMPA (MIN) – Minnipa Airport
 YMPC – RAAF Williams – Point Cook, Victoria
 YMQA (MQE) – Marqua Airport – Marqua
 YMRB (MOV) – Moranbah Airport – Moranbah, Queensland
 YMRW (MWB) – Morawa Airport – Morawa, Western Australia
 YMRY (MYA) – Moruya Airport – Moruya, New South Wales
 YMSF (MTD) – Mount Sanford Station Airport – Mount Sanford, Northern Territory
 YMTB (UTB) – Muttaburra Airport – Muttaburra
 YMTG (MGB) – Mount Gambier Airport – Mount Gambier, South Australia
 YMTI (ONG) – Mornington Island Airport – Mornington Island
 YMTO (MNQ) – Monto Airport
 YMUC (MUQ) – Muccan Station Airport
 YMUE – Mount Borradale Airport – Gunbalanya, Northern Territory
 YMUG (MNE) – Mungeranie Airport
 YMUI (MYI) – Murray Island Airport – Murray Island, Queensland
 YMUK (MVK) – Mulka Airport
 YMUP (MUP) – Mulga Park Airport
 YMVG (MKV) – Mount Cavenagh Airport
 YMWA (MXU) – Mullewa Airport – Mullewa, Western Australia
 YMWT (MWT) – Moolawatana Airport
 YMWX (MXD) – Marion Downs Airport
 YMYB (MBH) – Maryborough Airport – Maryborough, Queensland
 YMYR (MYO) – Myroodah Airport
 YMYT (RTY) – Merty Merty Airport – Merty Merty

YN 
 YNAP (NMR) – Nappa Merrie Airport – Nappa Merrie
 YNAR (NRA) – Narrandera Airport – Narrandera, New South Wales
 YNBR (NAA) – Narrabri Airport – Narrabri, New South Wales
 YNEY – Nelly Bay Helipad – Magnetic Island, Queensland
 YNGU (RPM) – Ngukurr Airport – Roper River, Northern Territory
 YNHL – Nhill Airport – Nhill, Victoria
 YNPE (ABM) – Northern Peninsula Airport – Bamaga, Northern Territory
 YNRC (NAC) Naracoorte Airport – Naracoorte, South Australia
 YNRG (NRG) – Narrogin Airport – Narrogin
 YNRM – Narromine Airport – Narromine, New South Wales
 YNRV (RVT) – Ravensthorpe Airport – Ravensthorpe, Western Australia
 YNSH (NSV) – Noosa Airport
 YNSM (NSM) – Norseman Airport – Norseman, Western Australia
 YNTN (NTN) – Normanton Airport – Normanton, Queensland
 YNUL (NLL) – Nullagine Airport
 YNUM (NUB) – Numbulwar Airport – Numbulwar
 YNWN (ZNE) – Newman Airport – Newman, Western Australia
 YNYN (NYN) – Nyngan Airport – Nyngan, New South Wales

YO 
 YOEN (OPI) – Oenpelli Airport
 YOLA (XCO) – Colac Airport – Colac, Victoria
 YOLD (OLP) – Olympic Dam Airport
 YOLW (ONS) – Onslow Airport – Onslow, Western Australia
 YOOD (ODD) – Oodnadatta Airport – Oodnadatta
 YOOM (MOO) – Moomba Airport – Moomba, South Australia
 YORB (RBS) – Orbost Airport – Orbost, Victoria
 YORC (OKB) – Orchid Beach Airport – Orchid Beach, Queensland
 YORG (OAG) – Orange Airport – Orange, New South Wales
 YORV (ODR) – Ord River Airport – Ord River, Western Australia
 YOUY (OYN) – Ouyen Airport – Ouyen

YP 
 YPAD (ADL) – Adelaide Airport – Adelaide, South Australia
 YPAG (PUG) – Port Augusta Airport – Port Augusta, South Australia
 YPAM (PMK) – Palm Island Airport – Palm Island, Queensland
 YPBO (PBO) – Paraburdoo Airport – Paraburdoo, Western Australia
 YPCC (CCK) – Cocos (Keeling) Island International Airport – Cocos (Keeling) Islands
 YPDI (PDE) – Pandie Pandie Airport – Pandie Pandie, South Australia
 YPDN (DRW) – Darwin International Airport / RAAF Darwin (joint use) – Darwin, Northern Territory
 YPDO (PRD) – Pardoo Station Airport – Pardoo Station
 YPEA – RAAF Pearce – Bullsbrook, Western Australia
 YPED – RAAF Edinburgh – Salisbury, South Australia
 YPGV (GOV) – Gove Airport – Nhulunbuy, Northern Territory
 YPIR (PPI) – Port Pirie Airport – Port Pirie, South Australia
 YPJT (JAD) – Jandakot Airport – Jandakot, Western Australia
 YPKA (KTA) – Karratha Airport – Karratha, Western Australia
 YPKG (KGI) – Kalgoorlie-Boulder Airport – Kalgoorlie, Western Australia
 YPKS (PKE) – Parkes Airport – Parkes, New South Wales
 YPKT (PKT) – Port Keats Airfield – Port Keats, Northern Territory
 YPKU (KNX) – Kununurra Airport – Kununurra, Western Australia
 YPLC (PLO) – Port Lincoln Airport – Port Lincoln, South Australia
 YPLM (LEA) – Learmonth Airport / RAAF Base Learmonth (joint use) – Exmouth, Western Australia
 YPMH (PXH) – Prominent Hill Airport – Prominent Hill
 YPMP (EDR) – Edward River Airport – Pormpuraaw, Queensland
 YPMQ (PQQ) – Port Macquarie Airport – Port Macquarie, New South Wales
 YPOD (PTJ) – Portland Airport – Portland, Victoria
 YPPD (PHE) – Port Hedland International Airport – Port Hedland, Western Australia
 YPPF – Parafield Airport – Salisbury, South Australia
 YPPH (PER) – Perth Airport – Redcliffe, Western Australia
 YPSH (PEA) – Penneshaw Airport
 YPTN (KTR) – RAAF Tindal – Katherine, Northern Territory
 YPWR (UMR) – RAAF Woomera – Woomera, South Australia
 YPXM (XCH) – Christmas Island Airport – Christmas Island

YQ 
 YQDI (UIR) – Quirindi Airport – Quirindi
 YQLP (ULP) – Quilpie Airport – Quilpie, Queensland
 YQNS (UEE) – Queenstown Airport – Queenstown, Tasmania

YR 
 YRED – Redcliffe Airport – Redcliffe, Queensland
 YREN (RMK) – Renmark Airport – Renmark, South Australia
 YRMD (RCM) – Richmond Airport – Richmond, Queensland
 YRMH – Royal Melbourne Hospital – Parkville, Victoria
 YRNG (RAM) – Ramingining Airport – Ramingining, Northern Territory
 YRRB (RPB) – Roper Bar Airport
 YROB (ROH) – Robinhood Airport
 YROE (RBU) – Roebourne Airport – Roebourne, Western Australia
 YROI (RBC) – Robinvale Airport – Robinvale, Victoria
 YROM (RMA) – Roma Airport – Roma, Queensland
 YRSW (RSW) – Ravenswood Airport – Ravenswood, Queensland
 YRTI (RTS) – Rottnest Island Airport – Rottnest Island, Western Australia
 YRTP (RTP) – Rutland Plains Airport – Rutland Plains, Queensland
 YRYH (RHL) – Roy Hill Station Airport – Roy Hill
 YRYP – Rayner Place Helipad – Yass, New South Wales

YS 
 YSAN (NDS) – Sandstone Airport – Sandstone, Western Australia
 YSBK (BWU) – Bankstown Airport – Bankstown, New South Wales
 YSCB (CBR) – Canberra Airport – Canberra, Australian Capital Territory
 YSCC – Scott Creek Airport, Clarendon, South Australia
 YSCN (CDU) – Camden Airport – Camden, New South Wales
 YSCR (SQC) – Southern Cross Airport
 YSDU (DBO) – Dubbo Airport – Dubbo, New South Wales
 YSGE (SGO) – St George Airport – St George, Queensland
 YSGW (ZGL) – South Galway Airport
 YSHG (SGP) – Shay Gap Airport – Shay Gap, Western Australia
 YSHK (MJK) – Shark Bay Airport – Denham, Western Australia
 YSHL (WOL) – Shellharbour Airport – City of Shellharbour, Shellharbour, New South Wales
 YSHR (WSY) – Whitsunday Airport – Shute Harbour, Airlie Beach
 YSHT (SHT) – Shepparton Airport – Shepparton, Victoria
 YSHW – Holsworthy Barracks – Holsworthy, New South Wales
 YSII (SBR) – Saibai Island Airport – Saibai Island
 YSMI (SIO) – Smithton Airport – Smithton, Tasmania
 YSMP (SHU) – Smith Point Airport – Cobourg / Smith Point, Northern Territory
 YSMR (STH) – Strathmore Station Airport – Strathmore, Queensland
 YSNB (SNB) – Snake Bay Airport – Melville Island, Northern Territory
 YSNF (NLK) – Norfolk Island Airport – Norfolk Island
 YSNW (NOA) – HMAS Albatross – Nowra, New South Wales
 YSOL (SLJ) – Solomon Airport – Karijini National Park, Western Australia
 YSPE (SNH) – Stanthorpe Airport – Stanthorpe, Queensland
 YSPK (SCG) – Spring Creek Airport
 YSPT (SHQ) – Southport Airport – Southport, Queensland
 YSPV (KSV) – Springvale Airport – Springvale, Queensland
 YSRD – Sunrise Dam Airport – Sunrise Dam Gold Mine, Western Australia
 YSRI (RCM) – RAAF Richmond – Richmond, New South Wales
 YSRN (SRN) – Strahan Airport – Strahan, Tasmania
 YSSY (SYD) – Sydney Airport – Mascot, New South Wales
 YSTA – Saint Arnaud Airport – St Arnaud, Victoria
 YSTH (HLS) – St Helens Airport – St Helens, Tasmania
 YSTW (TMW) – Tamworth Airport – Tamworth, New South Wales
 YSWG (WGA) – Wagga Wagga Airport – Wagga Wagga, New South Wales
 YSWH (SWH) – Swan Hill Airport – Swan Hill, Victoria
 YSWL (SWC) – Stawell Airport – Stawell, Victoria

YT 
 YTAA (XTR) – Tara Airport
 YTAB (TBL) – Tableland Homestead Airport
 YTAM (XTO) – Taroom Airport – Taroom, Queensland
 YTBB – Tumby Bay Airport – Tumby Bay, South Australia
 YTBR (TBK) – Timber Creek Airport – Timber Creek, Northern Territory
 YTDN – Tooradin Airfield – Tooradin, Victoria
 YTDR (TDR) – Theodore Airport – Theodore, Queensland
 YTEE (TQP) – Trepell Airport
 YTEF (TEF) – Telfer Airport – Telfer Mine
 YTEM (TEM) – Temora Airport – Temora, New South Wales
 YTGA (TAN) – Tangalooma Airport
 YTGM (XTG) – Thargomindah Airport – Thargomindah, Queensland
 YTGT (GTS) – The Granites Airport – The Granites, Northern Territory
 YTHD (TDN) – Theda Station Airport – Theda Station, Western Australia
 YTIB (TYB) – Tibooburra Airport – Tibooburra, New South Wales
 YTIT – Ti-Tree Airfield – Ti-Tree, Northern Territory
 YTKY (TKY) – Turkey Creek Airport – Warmun (Turkey Creek)
 YTMP (TPR) – Tom Price Airport – Tom Price, Western Australia
 YTMU (TUM) – Tumut Airport – Tumut, New South Wales
 YTMY (TYP) – Tobermorey Airport
 YTNG (THG) – Thangool Airport – Thangool, Queensland
 YTNK (TCA) – Tennant Creek Airport – Tennant Creek, Northern Territory
 YTOC (TCW) – Tocumwal Airport – Tocumwal, New South Wales
 YTQY – Torquay Airport – Torquay, Victoria
 YTRE (TRO) – Taree Airport – Taree, New South Wales
 YTST (TTX) – Mungalalu Truscott Airbase – Mungalalu, Western Australia
 YTWB (TWB) – Toowoomba City Aerodrome – Toowoomba, Queensland
 YTYA – Tyabb Airport – Tyabb, Victoria

YU 
 YUDA (UDA) – Undara Airport
 YUNY (CZY) – Cluny Airport
 YUSL (USL) – Useless Loop Airport – Useless Loop, Western Australia

YV 
 YVRD (VCD) – Victoria River Downs Airport – Victoria River Downs Station, Northern Territory

YW 
 YWAL (WLA) – Wallal Downs Airport – Wallal Downs, Western Australia
 YWAV (WAV) – Wave Hill Airport
 YWBL (WMB) – Warrnambool Airport – Warrnambool, Victoria
 YWBS (SYU) – Warraber Island Airport – Warraber Island, Queensland
 YWCA (WIO) – Wilcannia Airport – Wilcannia, New South Wales
 YWCH (WLC) – Walcha Airport – Walcha, New South Wales
 YWCK (WAZ) – Warwick Airport – Warwick, Queensland
 YWDH (WNR) – Windorah Airport – Windorah, Queensland
 YWGT (WGT) – Wangaratta Airport – Wangaratta, Victoria
 YWHA (WYA) – Whyalla Airport – Whyalla, South Australia
 YWIS – Williamson Airfield – Rockhampton, Queensland
 YWIT (WIT) – Wittenoom Airport
 YWKB (WKB) – Warracknabeal Airport – Warracknabeal, Victoria
 YWKI – Waikerie Airport – Waikerie, South Australia
 YWKS – Wilkins Runway – Wilkes Land, Antarctica
 YWLG (WGE) – Walgett Airport – Walgett, New South Wales
 YWLM (NTL) – Newcastle Airport / RAAF Williamtown (joint use) – Newcastle, New South Wales
 YWLU (WUN) – Wiluna Airport – Wiluna, Western Australia
 YWMP (WPK) – Wrotham Park Airport
 YWND (WDI) – Wondai Airport – Wondai
 YWOL (WOL) – Shellharbour Airport – Wollongong, New South Wales
 YWOR (WLL) – Wollogorang Airport
 YWRN (QRR) – Warren Airport – Warren, New South Wales
 YWSG – Watts Bridge Memorial Airfield – Cressbrook, Queensland
 YWSL – West Sale Airport – Sale, Victoria
 YWTL (WLO) – Waterloo Airport (Australia)
 YWTN (WIN) – Winton Airport – Winton, Queensland
 YWUD (WUD) – Wudinna Airport – Wudinna, South Australia
 YWVA (WVA) – Warnervale Airport – Warnervale, New South Wales
 YWWI (WWI) – Woodie Woodie Airport
 YWWL (WWY) – West Wyalong Airport – West Wyalong, New South Wales
 YWYF – Wycheproof Airport – Wycheproof
 YWYM (WYN) – Wyndham Airport – Wyndham, Western Australia
 YWYY (BWT) – Burnie Airport – Wynyard, Tasmania

YX 
 YXCB – Canberra Hospital – Canberra, Australian Capital Territory

YY 
 YYAL (YLG) – Yalgoo Airport
 YYLR (KYF) – Yeelirrie Airport
 YYKI (OKR) – Yorke Island Airport – Yorke Island
 YYMI (XMY) – Yam Island Airport – Yam Island, Queensland
 YYND (YUE) – Yuendumu Airport
 YYNG (NGA) – Young Airport – Young, New South Wales
 YYOR (ORR) – Yorketown Airport – Yorketown, South Australia
 YYRM – Yarram Airport – Yarram, Victoria
 YYTA (KYI) – Yalata Mission Airport
 YYWG – Yarrawonga Airport – Yarrawonga, Victoria

YZ 
 YZ – None

References

Footnotes

Sources
 Airservices Australia - Publications
 
  - includes IATA codes
 Aviation Safety Network - IATA and ICAO airport codes

Y
Airports, ICAO code: Y